The 1887–88 Football Association Challenge Cup was the 17th staging of the FA Cup, England's oldest football tournament. One hundred and forty-nine teams entered, twenty-one more than the previous season, although four of the one hundred and forty-nine never played a match.

This was the last season in which there were no qualifying rounds, so all entering clubs were placed in the first round.  After the formation of the Football League, a set of qualifying rounds was introduced, with League clubs given the right to request automatic exemption to the first round proper.

First round proper

Replays

Second round proper

Replay

Third round proper

Replays

Fourth round proper

Replays

Fifth round proper

Sixth round proper

Semi-finals

Final

References

 FA Cup Results Archive

1887-88
1887–88 in English football
FA Cup